C. R. Saraswathi is an Indian actress and politician who has predominantly appeared in Tamil films. She is currently acting as spokesperson of Amma Makkal Munnetra Kazhagam, a split group from All India Anna Dravida Munnetra Kazhagam.

Career 
C. R. Saraswathi started her career as a film actress in 1979 and joined All India Anna Dravida Munnetra Kazhagam in 1999. In 2014, she was appointed spokesperson for the AIADMK party by Jayalalithaa. She contested and lost in 2016 Tamil Nadu Assembly election at Pallavaram constituent assembly. She is currently in Amma Makkal Munnetra Kazhagam.

Election contested

Awards 

In 2004, she won Tamil Nadu government's Kalaimamani award for her contributions in Tamil film industry.

Filmography

References

External links

Living people
Actresses in Tamil cinema
Indian film actresses
Year of birth missing (living people)
Actresses in Malayalam cinema